The 1980–81 NCAA Division III men's ice hockey season began in November 1980 and concluded on March of the following year. This was the 8th season of Division III college ice hockey.

Regular season

Standings

See also
 1980–81 NCAA Division I men's ice hockey season
 1980–81 NCAA Division II men's ice hockey season

References

External links

 
NCAA